James McSherry (born  12 February 1952) is a former Scottish football player and manager.

Football career
McSherry's career started with Kilmarnock in 1970. A midfielder, McSherry had 118 appearances for the club and scored 8 goals. In 1975, he joined local rivals Ayr United, where he had 190 appearances and scored 10 goals. In 1982, McSherry joined Berwick Rangers as player-manager with 24 appearances and scored one goal. After leaving the Borderers in January 1983, McSherry had a short spell with Stirling Albion before spending a season with Cypriot club Pezoporikos Larnaca. In 1984, McSherry returned to the Binos for another brief spell before retiring from the game.

Post-playing career
In 1989, McSherry returned to football management, as assistant to Jim Fleeting at Rugby Park with Killie  and departed his position in 1992 before being appointed as Kilmarnock's commercial manager at Rugby Park and is currently mine host of the Wee Windaes hostelry in Ayr.

References

External links 
 

1952 births
Living people
Footballers from Glasgow
Scottish footballers
Association football midfielders
Scottish expatriate footballers
Expatriate footballers in Cyprus
Scottish football managers
Kilmarnock F.C. players
Ayr United F.C. players
Berwick Rangers F.C. players
Berwick Rangers F.C. managers
Stirling Albion F.C. players
Scottish Football League players
Cypriot First Division players
Scottish Football League managers
Scottish expatriate sportspeople in Cyprus
Pezoporikos Larnaca players
Kilmarnock F.C. non-playing staff
Kilwinning Rangers F.C. managers
Scottish Junior Football Association managers